IOK Media is a South Korean TV series production company, distributor, and marketer. It is a subsidiary of IOK Company.

List of works

References

External links
  

Television production companies of South Korea
Companies based in Seoul
Mass media companies established in 2012
South Korean companies established in 2012